The Crime of the Century is a 1933 American Pre-Code mystery film directed by William Beaudine and featuring a star-studded cast including Jean Hersholt, Wynne Gibson, Stuart Erwin, Frances Dee, and David Landau.

Plot
A bank official, whom a doctor had earlier hypnotized to obtain money from the bank's vault, is found murdered.

Cast
 Jean Hersholt as Dr. Emil Brandt
 Wynne Gibson as Freda Brandt
 Stuart Erwin as Dan McKee
 Frances Dee as Doris Brandt
 Gordon Westcott as Gilbert Reid
 Robert Elliott as Police Capt. Timothy Riley
 David Landau as Police Lt. Frank Martin
 William Janney as Jim Brandt
 Bodil Rosing as Hilda Ericson - Maid
 Torben Meyer as Eric Ericson - Butler
 Samuel S. Hinds as Philip Ames

External links
 
 
 

1933 films
1930s crime thriller films
American detective films
American crime thriller films
Films directed by William Beaudine
Films produced by B. P. Schulberg
American black-and-white films
Films with screenplays by Florence Ryerson
1930s English-language films
1930s American films